Alan Jay Pakula (April 7, 1928 – November 19, 1998) was an American film director, writer and producer.  He was nominated for three Academy Awards: Best Picture for To Kill a Mockingbird (1962), Best Director for All the President's Men (1976) and Best Adapted Screenplay for Sophie's Choice (1982).

Pakula was also notable for directing his "paranoia trilogy": Klute (1971), The Parallax View (1974) and All the President's Men (1976).

Early life
Pakula was born in The Bronx, New York, to Polish Jewish parents, Jeanette (née Goldstein) and Paul Pakula. He was educated at The Hill School in Pottstown, Pennsylvania, and Yale University, where he majored in drama.

Career
Pakula started his Hollywood career as an assistant in the cartoon department at Warner Bros.. In 1957, he undertook his first production role for Paramount Pictures. In 1962, he produced To Kill a Mockingbird, for which he was nominated for an Academy Award for Best Picture. Pakula had a successful professional relationship as the producer of movies directed by Mockingbird director Robert Mulligan from 1957 to 1968. In 1969, he directed his first feature, The Sterile Cuckoo, starring Liza Minnelli.

In 1971, Pakula released the first installment of what would informally come to be known as his "paranoia trilogy". Klute, the story of a relationship between a private eye (played by Donald Sutherland) and a call girl (played by Jane Fonda, who won an Oscar for her performance), was a commercial and critical success. This was followed in 1974 by The Parallax View starring Warren Beatty, a labyrinthine post-Watergate thriller involving political assassinations. The film has been noted for its experimental use of hypnotic imagery in a celebrated film-within-a-film sequence in which the protagonist is inducted into the Parallax Corporation, whose main, although secret, enterprise is domestic terrorism.

Finally, in 1976, Pakula rounded out the "trilogy" with All the President's Men, based on the bestselling account of the Watergate scandal written by Bob Woodward and Carl Bernstein, who were played in the movie by Robert Redford and Dustin Hoffman, respectively. It was another commercial hit, considered by many critics and fans to be one of the best thrillers of the 1970s.

Pakula scored another hit in 1982 with Sophie's Choice, starring Meryl Streep. His screenplay, based on the novel by William Styron, was nominated for an Academy Award. Later commercial successes included Presumed Innocent, based on the bestselling novel by Scott Turow, and another political thriller, The Pelican Brief, an adaptation of John Grisham's bestseller. His final film was the crime drama thriller film The Devil's Own, where he reunited with Harrison Ford.

Personal life
From October 19, 1963, until 1971, Pakula was married to actress Hope Lange. He was married to his second wife, Hannah Pakula (formerly Hannah Cohn Boorstin) from 1973 until his death in 1998.

He had two stepchildren from his marriage with Hope Lange, Christopher and Patricia Murray and three stepchildren from his second marriage. They are Louis, Robert and Anna Boorstin. He also spoke very openly about his stepson's battle with depression before his death.

Death
On November 19, 1998, Pakula was driving on the Long Island Expressway in Melville, New York, when a driver in front of him struck a metal pipe, causing  it to crash through Pakula's windshield, striking him in the head. His car swerved off the road and into a fence. He was taken to North Shore University Hospital, where he was pronounced dead.

Filmography

References

Further reading

External links

 
 
 Alan J. Pakula papers. Margaret Herrick Library, Academy of Motion Picture Arts and Sciences.

1928 births
1998 deaths
20th-century American Jews
20th-century American businesspeople
20th-century American male writers
20th-century American screenwriters
American Jews
American male screenwriters
American people of Polish-Jewish descent
Burials at Green River Cemetery
Film directors from New York City
Film producers from New York (state)
Jewish American screenwriters
People from the Bronx
Road incident deaths in New York (state)
Screenwriters from New York (state)
The Hill School alumni
Yale University alumni